Arglye House is a heritage listed building located at 42-50 Stirling Terrace overlooking Princess Royal Harbour in Albany in the Great Southern region of Western Australia.

The two-storey building has a rendered brick façade with a hipped corrugated iron roof only just above a parapet wall. A central raised pediment has a bas-relief with the words "Argyle House" inscribed. A single line of arched windows are a feature across the second storey of the building. It was constructed in the 1890s in a style matching the adjacent Edinburgh and Glasgow Houses. The Adelaide Steamship Company occupied the building in 1897, and in 1901 the owner was Elizabeth Dunn. It was awarded a grant of 28,865 in 2015 to assist with painting, installing a new verandah and windows, and general conservation work.

See also
 List of places on the State Register of Heritage Places in the City of Albany

References

Heritage places in Albany, Western Australia
Stirling Terrace, Albany
State Register of Heritage Places in the City of Albany